Vaasa University of Applied Sciences popularly called VAMK, is an international higher education institution in Vaasa, Finland. VAMK educates Bachelors of Business Administration, Engineering, Hospitality Management and Social Services as well as Registered Nurses and Public Health Nurses in Finnish, Swedish and English for the demanding needs of the working life. It has approximately 3,300 students enrolled and a staff of circa 250 members.

Programmes

VAMK offers education in three languages in a total of 17 degree programmes. In addition to the Finnish degree programmes, VAMK has three Swedish and three English degree programmes. Close collaboration with the working-life is an essential aspect of learning. A degree taken at the University of Applied Sciences includes theoretical, professional studies, practical training in specialty field and the final thesis.

Notable programmes include:
 Business Economics
 Tourism
 Health Care and Social Services
 Technology and Communication
 Information Processing

There are approximately 500 degree students in the ten adult education degree programmes. In the Open University of Applied Sciences you can add onto your professional skills or take degree-oriented studies. VAMK also offers degree programmes leading to a polytechnic master's degree. Specialisation studies are aimed at those already in the working life to supplement their professional skills. There is also continuing education for businesses and organisations in all fields taught at VAMK.

International profile

Internationality, multilingualism and multiculturalism are an integral part of teaching and everyday activities at VAMK. Yearly about 300 students from abroad, in addition to some 80 exchange students, pursue studies leading to a degree.

Each student can choose to get international experience by taking part of the studies or the practical training abroad. Yearly approximately 150 students of VAMK go abroad.

Modern learning environment

The learning and research premises at VAMK are up-to-date and well-equipped with modern facilities. Two campuses are located in the city centre and Palosaari, within walking distance from each other. Technobothnia, the technology research and teaching laboratory, provides engineering students with an excellent platform to participate in projects introducing the latest technology. The Tritonia academic library and learning centre serves research, education and studying at the institutions of higher education in Vaasa.

Vaasa City

Vaasa city is located by the Gulf of Bothnia in the west of Finland. With 60,000 inhabitants Vaasa is a lively centre for culture, education and tourism. Vaasa is in fact one of the biggest student cities in Finland. In total, the local student population exceeds 12,000 making every fifth person in Vaasa a student of higher education which guarantees diverse services involved in student activities and free time.

Student activity

The student union VAMOK provides spare-time activities, and more importantly, represents the interests of the students in the administration of VAMK.

Alumnus of the Year

In October, 2021, the Vaasa University of Applied Sciences held their first ever alumni event and chose the alumnus of the year. The award for Alumnus of the Year was given for the first time to Lukumanu Iddrisu, a community builder and an employee of Wärtsilä. The Alumnus of the Year award is given to a VAMK alumnus from any of the schools (Business, Engineering and Health Care & Social Sciences) who has distinguished him/herself and has made a positive impact on and off campus following the VAMK values of professionality, sympathy, integrity, responsibility and openness.

References

External links
Vaasa University of Applied Sciences Official Website in English
Student union VAMOK's Official Website in English

Education in Ostrobothnia (region)
Vaasa
Universities and colleges in Finland
1996 establishments in Finland